Lauren Holmes is an American author and writer of short stories. She published her first collection of short stories, Barbara the Slut and Other People, in 2015.

Life
Holmes was raised in the Hudson Valley in New York. She attended Wellesley College as an undergraduate, and received her MFA from Hunter College. Her work has appeared in Granta.

Work
Holmes cites Tracy Kidder, Barbara Demick, and Adrian Nicole LeBlanc as influences.  She began work on the collection in 2009. The work received mixed reviews.

References

Living people
American short story writers
Wellesley College alumni
Hunter College alumni
Year of birth missing (living people)